Joe Markley (born November 28, 1956) is an American politician who was a member of the Connecticut State Senate representing the 16th State Senate District from 2011 to 2019.  A native of Southington, Connecticut, he was first elected to the State Senate in 1984 at the age of 27, serving only one term.  He returned to the chamber in 2010 at the age of 53, but left again in 2019. He was the Republican Nominee for Lieutenant Governor of Connecticut in 2018, but lost the general election to Democrat Susan Bysiewicz.

Early life

Joe Markley was born in Southington, Connecticut on November 28, 1956.  Through his mother, Priscilla Cowles, his family has resided continuously in the town since the 1730s.  Markley attended Southington High School, graduating in 1974.  He then earned his bachelor's degree from Amherst College and his master's degree in English from Columbia University.

Political career

First State Senate stint
On November 6, 1984, Markley, a member of the Republican Party was first elected to the Connecticut State Senate due in part to the Reagan landslide of 1984 where President Reagan carried over 60% of the vote in the state.  He ran for re-election in 1986, but was defeated – consistent with the national trend of the 1986 midterm elections where Democrats made gains throughout the country.

Twenty-four year hiatus
When Lowell Weicker proposed a state income tax for Connecticut in 1991, Markley, along with Tom Scott formed the Connecticut Taxpayers Committee to spearhead the opposition.  On October 5, 1991 they organized the largest rally in Connecticut history to be held on the grounds of the state capitol.

Markley also returned to teaching where he taught English at the high school and college levels.

Second State Senate stint
On November 2, 2010, Markley returned to the State Senate for a second tenure.  He has since been re-elected three times, running unopposed by the Democrats in 2014.  He was one of Governor Malloy's most outspoken critics, sparking rumors he might run as a gubernatorial candidate in 2018.

Campaign for party chairman
Markley announced his intention to seek the Connecticut Republican Party chairmanship  after incumbent party chairman Jerry Labriola, Jr. announced he would not seek re-election after failing to capitalize on the nationwide republican momentum to defeat Governor Malloy or any congressional seat in the 2014 mid-term elections.  Markley's platform for chairman was not to rebrand the party but to rejuvenate support for the party at the state level.  "Many national donors who live in Connecticut have given up on the state party. They must be convinced that we are worthy of their support, both because we stand for a genuine change in direction and because we can win (the two, of course, are inseparable),"  On June 23, 2015, Markley faced off against two competitors in the first contested chairmanship election since the 1980s.  Markley finished third in the first round of balloting to J.R. Romano and John Pavia.  Romano would ultimately be selected as chairman.

2018 lieutenant gubernatorial campaign
Markley filed paperwork to seek the position of Lieutenant Governor in the 2018 Gubernatorial elections stating "I feel that this is the spot on the ticket where I can most be of service."  He was nominated at the statewide Republican convention as the endorsed candidate of the Republican party with 53.6% of the delegate vote.  Both Erin Stewart, mayor of New Britain, CT and Jamie Stevenson of Darien, CT qualified for a primary against him to be held on August 14, 2018. Markley won the Connecticut Primary for Lieutenant Governor with 47.6% of the vote.  He ran with Bob Stefanowski, who won the Connecticut Republican primary for Governor, before losing to Ned Lamont and running mate Susan Bysiewicz.

Electoral history

State Senate

Lieutenant Governor

References

|-

1956 births
21st-century American politicians
Amherst College alumni
Columbia Graduate School of Arts and Sciences alumni
Republican Party Connecticut state senators
Living people
People from Southington, Connecticut